
Hannibal (died 238 BCE) was a Carthaginian general who took part in the Mercenary War between Carthage and rebelling mercenaries.

During this war, he replaced Hanno II the Great as a commander of the Carthaginian army.  He took part in a successful campaign against some rebel cities, along with Hamilcar Barca. During the Siege of Tunis, he was captured during a night raid and crucified, along with some other high-ranking Carthaginians. French author Gustave Flaubert conflates his character with that of Hanno in his historical novel  Salammbô.

See also 
 Hannibal (given name)

References

Citations

Bibliography 
Goldsworthy, Adrian The Punic Wars, Cassell 2000, page 135
 .   
Eckstein, Arthur M.  Moral vision in the Histories of Polybius, University of California Press, 1995, p. 177
Polybius Histories
"Polybius on the Mercenaries War" Jorn Barger September 2002
Flaubert, Postscript to Salammbô

People executed by crucifixion
Carthaginian generals
Year of birth unknown
238 BC deaths
3rd-century BC Punic people